Ust-Zula is a rural locality (a selo) and the administrative center of Ust-Zulinskoye Rural Settlement, Yurlinsky District, Perm Krai, Russia. The population was 222 as of 2010. There are 4 streets.

Geography 
Ust-Zula is located 18 km northeast of Yurla (the district's administrative centre) by road. Novoselova is the nearest rural locality.

References 

Rural localities in Yurlinsky District